Marilinan Airfield is a former World War II airfield in Morobe Province, Papua New Guinea. The airfield was abandoned after the war and today has almost totally returned to its natural state.

History
The area was occupied by Allied forces in the middle of June 1943. The field was hastily constructed by the United States Army 871st Airborne Engineers. All supplies, food, fuel and equipment had to be flown into the base via C-47s from Port Moresby.

References

 Maurer, Maurer (1983). Air Force Combat Units Of World War II. Maxwell AFB, Alabama: Office of Air Force History. .

Airfields of the United States Army Air Forces in Papua New Guinea
Airports established in 1943